Richard Schiff (born May 27, 1955) is an American actor and director. He is best known for playing Toby Ziegler on The West Wing, a role for which he received an Emmy Award. Schiff made his directorial debut with The West Wing, directing an episode titled "Talking Points". He is on the National Advisory Board of the Council for a Livable World. He had a recurring role on the HBO series Ballers. Since September 2017 he has had a leading role in ABC's medical drama The Good Doctor, as Dr. Aaron Glassman, president of a fictional teaching hospital in San Jose, California.

Early life
Schiff was born on May 27, 1955, in Bethesda, Maryland, and was raised in New York City. He is the second of three sons of Charlotte, a television and publishing executive, and Edward Schiff, a real estate lawyer. His parents divorced, and Charlotte later married Clarence B. Jones, Martin Luther King Jr.'s lawyer. His early jobs before acting included driving a taxi in New York City and cleaning buses in the Greyhound terminal on 11th Avenue. "It was a Teamster job, from 11pm to 7am. ... We cleaned the grease off bus wheels with diesel fuel. I also laid cable for Manhattan Cable Television. I was a Teamster in the International Brotherhood of Electrical Workers".

Schiff and his family are Jewish. His grandfather had alleged connections to the Jewish Mafia of New York. He studied acting at the William Esper Studio.

Career
Schiff initially studied directing. He directed several off-Broadway plays, including Antigone in 1983 with a just-graduated Angela Bassett. In the mid-1980s Schiff decided to try his hand at acting and landed several TV roles. He was seen by Steven Spielberg in an episode of the TV drama High Incident and was cast in The Lost World: Jurassic Park (1997) which led to being cast more frequently and eventually to the role as White House Communications Director Toby Ziegler in the television series The West Wing. Schiff became known for his reclusive and intense approach to his craft as well as his low-key delivery style.

In 1995, Schiff portrayed a lawyer in Se7en. In 1996, he guest-starred on the TV series ER (Season 2, Episode 17), and appeared in NYPD Blue the following year. In 1996, he portrayed a corrupt probation officer in City Hall along with Al Pacino and John Cusack. Schiff portrayed a doctor alongside Eddie Murphy in the 1998 Dr. Dolittle remake. He also portrayed Col./Brig. Gen. Robert Laurel Smith in the 1998 HBO TV movie The Pentagon Wars, based on the real-life development of the US Army's Bradley Infantry Fighting Vehicle. The same year, Schiff appeared in the movie Deep Impact. Schiff appeared in one episode of Becker during its first season. In 2001, he acted in the movie What's the Worst That Could Happen? starring Martin Lawrence and Danny DeVito. He played the part of the tough lawyer Mr. Turner in I Am Sam opposite Sean Penn and Michelle Pfeiffer and co-starred in People I Know with Al Pacino.

Schiff appeared in Ray as Jerry Wexler, shaving his beard for the role. After working on The West Wing for six seasons, Schiff chose to leave the series, fulfilling his contractual obligations by appearing in half of the final season's episodes. That same year, he starred alongside Peter Krause in Civic Duty.

Schiff had a cameo appearance as himself in the second-season finale of the series Entourage. The scene has Schiff at lunch with his agent Ari Gold, where he declares a desire to act in action movies. He appeared again as a fictionalized version of himself in Entourage (2015). He also starred in the premiere run of Underneath the Lintel, a one-act, single-character play by Glen Berger, at the George Street Playhouse in New Brunswick, New Jersey. In February 2007, he appeared in the West End production of Underneath the Lintel in the Duchess Theatre in London, England, and appeared on BBC Radio Five Live and talked at length to Simon Mayo about his experiences acting in The West Wing and his new West End production. In 2007, he appeared as Philip Cowen in the season finale of Burn Notice. A radio version of Underneath the Lintel, performed by Schiff, was broadcast by BBC Radio 4 on January 5, 2008. Schiff starred in Lanford Wilson's Talley's Folly at the McCarter Theatre Center in Princeton, New Jersey in fall 2008 as accountant Matt Friedman, opposite Margot White as Sally Talley. Later that year Schiff co-starred in Last Chance Harvey with Dustin Hoffman and Emma Thompson and Another Harvest Moon with Ernest Borgnine and appeared in the season finale of Eli Stone.

Schiff portrayed Charles Fischer in Terminator: The Sarah Connor Chronicles in the Season 2 episode "Complications". The character was a collaborator of Skynet and a traitor to the resistance. He was sent back in time to the present as a reward for his service to Skynet. He played an Orthodox rabbi on an episode of In Plain Sight with former West Wing co-star Mary McCormack. In 2009, he co-starred in the movies Imagine That, with Eddie Murphy, and Solitary Man, with Michael Douglas and Susan Sarandon. Later in 2009, he returned to London to shoot two other movies: The Infidel, in which he starred opposite Omid Djalili, and Made in Dagenham, with Sally Hawkins and Bob Hoskins. Schiff also appeared as a hypnotist in one episode of Monks seventh season.

Schiff starred in Past Life. He also had a recurring role in Criminal Minds: Suspect Behavior as FBI Director Jack Fickler. Schiff had a recurring role in The Cape. He also has guest-starred on Any Human Heart with Jim Broadbent playing the role of a psychiatrist and on White Collars second-season episode 15. He also played the role of an ex-CIA agent in a terrorist organization in Johnny English Reborn. In April 2011, Schiff returned to the London West End in the play Smash! He played opposite Rob Lowe in the drama Knife Fight, and starred opposite Josh Duhamel, Rosario Dawson and Bruce Willis in Fire with Fire. Schiff played an important plot character in three episodes of CBS's NCIS, bridging seasons 9 and 10, as Harper Dearing, the replacement for Osama bin Laden on the Most Wanted Wall for attacks against the United States Navy.

Schiff was cast to star in the Showtime series House of Lies, starring Kristen Bell and Don Cheadle. He also starred in the TV movie Innocent with Bill Pullman. He had a recurring guest role in the TV series Once Upon A Time and joined Helen Hunt and former West Wing star Bradley Whitford in the movie Decoding Annie Parker. Schiff starred in the political series Chasing The Hill.

In late 2012 and early 2013 he portrayed George Aaronow in a Broadway revival of Glengarry Glen Ross. He portrayed Erie Smith in a revival of the Eugene O'Neill play, Hughie, at the Shakespeare Theatre Company in Washington, D.C., in February and March 2013, and Dr. Emil Hamilton in Zack Snyder's 2013 Superman film, Man of Steel. In September 2014, Schiff returned to the West End in a revival of Speed-the-Plow by David Mamet, co-starring Lindsay Lohan. In 2015, Schiff appeared as Dwayne Johnson's character's boss on HBO's Ballers. Around the same time, he also had roles in the films Kill the Messenger, The Automatic Hate, and Take Me to the River.

Schiff had a regular role on the TNT's crime drama Murder in the First as David Hertzberg. The show also starred Taye Diggs, Kathleen Robertson, and Tom Felton.

He provided the facial and motion capture, and voice for Odin in Santa Monica Studio's game God of War Ragnarök, released in 2022.

Personal life
Schiff and actress Sheila Kelley married in 1996. Kelley played Schiff's character's love interest, and later his wife, on The Good Doctor. They have a son, Gus, born in 1994, and a daughter, Ruby, born in August 2000.

Schiff has supported Democratic candidates, but has said he is not a registered member of the party. He supported Barack Obama in the 2008 U.S. presidential election. Previously, he had endorsed then-Senator Joe Biden, before Biden dropped out. In 2016, Schiff supported Senator Bernie Sanders during the Democratic primaries. He endorsed Cynthia Nixon's bid for Governor of New York in the 2018 election. Schiff supported Joe Biden in the 2020 election.

On November 10, 2020, Schiff announced that he and his wife had tested positive for COVID-19 on Election Day and were quarantining at their home in Vancouver. The following Monday, he announced he was hospitalized, but "showing improvements" while Kelley was at home "doing better", but still sick. On November 19, 2020, Schiff was released from the hospital.

Filmography

Film

Television

Video games

References

External links

 
 
 

1955 births
20th-century American male actors
21st-century American male actors
21st-century American Jews
American male film actors
American male stage actors
American male television actors
City College of New York alumni
Jewish American male actors
Living people
Male actors from Maryland
Male actors from New York City
Maryland Democrats
Outstanding Performance by a Supporting Actor in a Drama Series Primetime Emmy Award winners
People from Bethesda, Maryland
William Esper Studio alumni